Kilmarnock Academy (Scottish Gaelic: Acadamaidh Chille Mheàrnaig), formerly Kilmarnock Burgh School, is a state-funded secondary school in Kilmarnock, Scotland, currently located on Sutherland Drive in the New Farm Loch area of the town. The former original building in Elmbank Drive was erected in 1807. The school can be traced back to the 1630s when it was known as 'Kilmarnock Burgh School'. The school's operations are overseen by East Ayrshire Council.

Kilmarnock Academy is one of a few schools in the UK, and the only school in Scotland, to have educated several Nobel laureates: Alexander Fleming, discoverer of penicillin, and John Boyd Orr, 1st Baron Boyd-Orr, for his scientific research into nutrition and his work as the first Director-General of the United Nations Food and Agriculture Organization (FAO). Kilmarnock Academy thus matches Eton College in the number of Nobel laureate graduates.

In 2022, it was ranked as the 233rd best performing state school in Scotland, an increase from 247th in the 2021 league table rankings.

The current head teacher is David Rose who was appointed in June 2015 on an acting basis, and was made permanent Head Teacher of Kilmarnock Academy (the newly formed school following merger with James Hamilton Academy) in April 2017.

History and building complex
The former school campus located in Elmbank Drive closed in March 2018 following the merger of Kilmarnock Academy and James Hamilton Academy to allow the creation of a new secondary school which is located within the new William McIllvaney Campus to allow educational provision to transfer to a newly constructed building located in the New Farm Loch area of the town which was home to the then existing James Hamilton Academy building. The name Kilmarnock Academy was retained for the new secondary school, whilst the name James Hamilton was transferred to the new primary school and early childhood centre. All pupils and staff transferred to the newly built building on Sutherland Drive between 17 and 18 April 2018.

Elmbank Drive (1807–2018)
The school consists of four parts. The 'old building', a listed building in use since 1898 and part of the initial Kilmarnock Academy; the 'new building,' a larger building opened in 1967 and connected to the old building by a link corridor; the Technical Extension which opened in 1997 and is now where the schools computing and music departments are situated, and the P.E. building, where the Physical Education department is situated. This is also rented out to groups such as a Tae Kwon Do club and local football teams. Next to the school is the "Old Tech," formerly Kilmarnock Technical School, which opened in 1910 as part of the Academy. It is also listed, but is no longer part of the school; it was closed in 1997 due to a reduction in student numbers, caused by a restructuring of educational resources in the area. The building remained closed, and reopened in 2006 as luxury housing, due to its prime location directly next to the Dick Institute, the town's primary library and museum, and the centre of town.

It can trace its history back to the local burgh school founded in the 1630s and the first school to bear the name was established in 1807.  In 1898 the school was moved to its current location and in the early 1900s the school acquired the Kilmarnock Technical School for its use. From 1945 it was a state co-educational grammar school. It became a comprehensive school in 1968 and fees were abolished for students attending Kilmarnock Academy in 1945 following World War II. For the first time since opening, Kilmarnock Academy appointed its first woman Head Teacher, Carole Ford, who served in the position from 1997–2011.

At one point, Kilmarnock Academy provided both primary and secondary education to Kilmarnock's school children. The school at one point was a fee-paying school until 1969 when it became a government funded state school.

Throughout 1996–1998, the school roll was decreased by the educational authority to allow the commencement of a £2.5 programme of refurbishment work to bring the school up to an adequate standard for 21st century learning and teaching.

Sutherland Drive (2018–)

The William McIllvanney Campus, containing Kilmarnock Academy, James Hamilton Primary School and Early Childhood Centre and a Gaelic education unit, was handed over to East Ayrshire Council from Keir Construction on 30 March 2018. The former Kilmarnock Academy and James Hamilton Academy both closed their doors to pupils on Tuesday 27 March 2018 and officially closed on 29 March 2018 after staff had decanted both buildings of furniture and resources. The new Kilmarnock Academy opened to pupils on Wednesday 18 April 2018.

Buildings

School structure
The former Kilmarnock Academy building is situated upon a hill in Elmbank Drive. Because of this, it is a dominant building in the Kilmarnock skyline. Following the move to a new site, the former Kilmarnock Academy closed and since its closure, it has been transformed and is now occupied by CentreStage, an arts academy operating in Ayrshire. 

Until June 2015, the headteacher was Bryan Paterson, assisted by his Depute Headteachers G Kerr & E Walker. Paterson assumed the role of headteacher in August 2011 after the retiral of Carole Ford. The Head Teacher, David Rose (2015–present) was employed on a temporary basis, but was given the post of Head Teacher at the new school which incorporated James Hamilton Academy. This investment of £45.303m for the new Kilmarnock campus, has been named William McIlvanney Campus.

Merger process (2013–2018)

In 2013, East Ayrshire Council launched a consultation report on the future of the education provision at a number of primary and secondary schools in the Kilmarnock area, including James Hamilton Academy, New Farm Primary School, New Farm Early Childhood Centre and Silverwood Primary School. This report put forward the case for educational provision at the schools coming to an end in term 2016/2017 (however, as of January 2017, this has run over time and projected now for 2018 completion), and the named educational establishments merge into one campus. This would lead to the creation of a "superschool", merging James Hamilton Academy and Kilmarnock Academy together, as well as New Farm Primary, New Farm Early Childhood Centre and Silverwood Primary together. In 2016, the decision was made to house these schools on the newly formed William Mcilvanney campus, named after the late William McIlvanney who was born in Kilmarnock and best-selling crime author. The secondary provision will remain as Kilmarnock Academy, whilst the primary provision is renamed as James Hamilton Primary and Early Childhood Centre.

On 12 October 2016, Deputy First Minister of Scotland in his capacity of Cabinet Secretary for Education and Skills, John Swinney, visited the site of the construction for the new school where he laid the foundation stone for the new structure. Pupils from each of the schools involved in the merger – Kilmarnock Academy, James Hamilton Academy, Silverwood Primary School and New Farm Primary School, choose items to bury in a time capsule underneath the structure of the new school.

The new school campus was projected to open in March 2018. In March 2018, it was announced by both East Ayrshire Council and Centrestage Communities Ltd. that as part of the Scottish Government Regenerational Grant Funding that the old Kilmarnock Academy building, which is listed, would be used as the new home for Kilmarnock-based charity CentreStage. CentreStage moved from their former James Little Street premises, and opened on the Elmbank Drive site in August 2021.

Rectors/head teachers 

The following list is of rectors of Kilmarnock Academy. In recent years, the term 'rector' has been phased out to introduce the title of 'head teacher'. Bryan Paterson held the post from August 2011 until June 2015, becoming head teacher at Trinity Academy, Edinburgh.

Carole Ford was the first woman to serve as head teacher, from 1997–2011, and remains the only female to have taken up the position.

The current head teacher is David Rose. He was responsible for the transition and merger of Kilmarnock Academy and James Hamilton Academy at a new school campus.

Rector
 William Thomson (1808–1830)
 Alexander Harkness (1830–1851)
 William Taylor (1851–1852)
 Alexander Smith (1852–1869)
 George Younger (1869–1873)
 George Smith (1873–1876)
 Hugh Dickie (1876–1904) 
 David Murray (1904–1907) 
 Dr James Clark (1907–1926)
 Alexander Cumming (1926–1938) 
 Robert McIntyre (1938–1964) 
 James Hislop OBE (1964–1977) 
 Frank Donnelly (1977–1997)

Head Teacher

 Carole Ford (1997–2011)
 Bryan Paterson (2011–2015)
 David Rose (2015–present)

Notable former pupils

Kilmarnock Academy is one of the few schools in the world to have educated several Nobel laureates: Alexander Fleming and John Boyd Orr.

Notable alumni
Rev Prof Hugh Anderson (1920–2003) theologian
 Air Vice-Marshal Stuart Atha, AOC since 2011 of No. 1 Group RAF, and Station Commander from 2006–08 of RAF Coningsby
 Craig Conway, Scotland international footballer
 Bob Ellis (born 1940), cricketer
 Nesbitt Gallacher (born 1936), cricketer
 Bobby Hill (1938–2017), cricketer
 Air Chief Marshall Stephen Hillier, Chief of the Air Staff 2016–
 Major General Sir Robert Murdoch Smith, engineer, archaeologist and diplomat
 Lorraine Fullbrook (Campbell), Conservative Member of Parliament, South Ribble, Lancashire – Elected 2010
Ronnie Hamilton, professional footballer
Hugh Whyte (1955-2009) Doctor and  Scottish football goalkeeper, who played for Hibernian and Dunfermline Athletic

Grammar school
 Rev. James Barr, Labour MP from 1935 to 1945 for Coatbridge, and from 1924 to 1931 for Motherwell
 Rev. Prof. Matthew Black, Professor of Divinity and Biblical Criticism from 1954 to 1978 at the University of St Andrews
 Robert Colquhoun, artist
 Stewart Conn, poet and playwright
 Sir David Cuthbertson, physician
 Robert Dunsmuir
 George Forrest, botanist and explorer
 Adam Ingram, SNP MSP since 2011 for Carrick, Cumnock and Doon Valley
 Jimmy Knapp, General Secretary from 1990 to 2001 of the RMT, and from 1983 to 1990 of the National Union of Railwaymen
 Sir James Learmonth CBE, pioneer in nerve surgery
 Margaret McDowall, swimmer
 William McIlvanney, author
Lt-Gen Robert Menzies CB OBE, Surgeon General to the Armed Forces from 2000 to 2002
 William Muir, orientalist
 Colin Rankin
 James Stevenson, 1st Baron Stevenson, businessman and politician
 Peter Sturrock, Conservative MP from 1885 to 1886 for Kilmarnock Burghs
 Murray Tosh MBE, Conservative MSP from 2003 to 2007 for the West of Scotland
 Hugh Watt (1848–1921) MP
 Marie Macklin CBE, CEO of The KLIN Group and founder and executive chair of The HALO Urban Regeneration

Church of Scotland clergy
A number of alumni are Church of Scotland ministers who have held high office or are otherwise well-known church figures:
 Andrew McLellan CBE, Moderator of the General Assembly, 2000; (also HM Chief Inspector of Prisons for Scotland, 2002 to 2009)
 John D. Miller, Moderator of the General Assembly, 2001
 Bill Hewitt, Moderator of the General Assembly, 2009
 John L. Bell, contemporary hymnwriter and speaker
 Lorna Hood (née Mitchell), Moderator of the General Assembly, 2013

References

External links
 Kilmarnock Academy's Website
 Kilmarnock Academy Masters and Former Pupils who died in World War 1 and 2.
 Kilmarnock Academy's page on Scottish Schools Online

Secondary schools in East Ayrshire
Educational institutions established in the 1630s
Kilmarnock
Educational institutions established in 1807